The Saratoga Springs Visitor Center, located at 297 Broadway in Saratoga Springs, Saratoga County, New York, in the building known historically as "The Drinkhall", was built in 1915 as a trolley station by the Hudson Valley Railroad. It was designed by Ludlow and Peabody in the Beaux Arts style.

The building consists of four sections.  The three-bay, stuccoed central block is flanked by lower -story, three-bay wings.  The rear section has an open porch that served as the trolley platform. It is constructed of hollow red clay tile and topped by a slate hipped roof. The building features a decorative frieze with arrowhead motifs and decorative panels in the Beaux-Arts style.  The interior of the central block features a high barrel vault ceiling.

The Drinkhall was listed on the National Register of Historic Places in 1974.

References

External links

Saratoga Springs Visitor Center website

Railway stations on the National Register of Historic Places in New York (state)
Beaux-Arts architecture in New York (state)
Buildings and structures completed in 1915
Buildings and structures in Saratoga Springs, New York
National Register of Historic Places in Saratoga County, New York
Railway stations in the United States  opened in 1915
Former railway stations in New York (state)